Daniela Herz-Schnoekel (born 1954) is a German businesswoman, former part-owner of the German coffee shop and retail chain Tchibo.

Early life
Herz-Schnoekel is the daughter of Max Herz and Ingeburg Herz. Her father co-founded Tchibo in 1949 with Carl Tchilinghiryan.

Family business
In 2003, these three family members bought out Herz-Schnoekel and her brother, Günter Herz's 40% stake. Tchibo is 100% owned by three members of the Herz family, Herz-Schnoekel's mother  and two of her brothers, Michael and Wolfgang Herz.

Career
According to Forbes, Herz-Schnoekel has a net worth of $2.8 billion, as of May 2015.

Personal life
Herz-Schnoekel is married, and lives in Hamburg. In 2008, her brother Joachim died in a motorboat accident.

References 

1954 births
Female billionaires
German billionaires
20th-century German businesspeople
21st-century German businesspeople
German businesspeople in retailing
Daniela
Living people